Henrik Fig is a retired Danish association football midfielder who played professionally in Denmark, Germany and the United States.

Fig began his career with Vejle Boldklub, playing on the club's first team from 1991 to 1995.  In the spring of 1995, he moved to the United States to sign with the Colorado Foxes of the American Professional Soccer League.  In 1996, he returned to Vejle where he played until 2002.  That year, he moved to Flensburg 08, a German lower-division club.

He is the brother of the player Thomas Fig.

References

External links
 

Living people
1972 births
American Professional Soccer League players
Colorado Foxes players
Danish men's footballers
Danish expatriate men's footballers
Vejle Boldklub players
Association football midfielders